Bitozeves is a municipality and village in Louny District in the Ústí nad Labem Region of the Czech Republic. It has about 500 inhabitants.

Administrative parts
Villages of Nehasice, Tatinná and Vidovle, and the area of the industrial zone called Bitozeves-Průmyslová zóna Triangle are administrative parts of Bitozeves.

References

Villages in Louny District